Agathangelos (in  Agatʿangełos, in Greek  "bearer of good news" or angel,  5th century AD ) is the pseudonym of the author of a life of the first apostle of Armenia, Gregory the Illuminator, who died about 332.

He claims to be a secretary of Tiridates III, King of Armenia in the early 4th century, but the life was not written before the 5th century. It purports to exhibit the deeds and discourses of Gregory, and has reached us in Armenian, Greek, Georgian, Syriac, Ethiopic, Latin and Arabic. The text of this history has been considerably altered, but it has always been in high favor with the Armenians. Von Gutschmid maintains that the unknown author made use of a genuine life of St. Gregory, also of a history of his martyrdom and of that of Saint Rhipsime and her companions. Historical facts are intermingled in this life with legendary or uncertain additions, and the whole is woven into a certain unity by the narrator, who may have assumed his significant name from his quality of narrator of "the good news" of Armenia's conversion. It has been translated into several languages, and Greek and Latin translations are found in the Acta Sanctorum Bollandistarum, tome viii.

According to Agathangelos, he was tasked by Tiridates III to write about his father Khosrov II of Armenia and his reign period. Until the 19th century, based on this fact, scholars believe that Agathangelos lived in the 4th century. However further detailed research of his writing has demonstrated that Agathangelos lived and worked in the 5th century and was not able to be Tiridates III's secretary.

Notes

Sources
 
 

Agathangelos, History of St. Gregory and the Conversion of Armenia
 Agathangelos, History of the Armenians,  Robert W. Thomson, State University of New York Press, 1974

External links

Agathangelos in the Digital Library Of Armenian Literature
Agathangelos at Livius.org

Historians of the Caucasus
5th-century Armenian historians